Marvell may refer to:

 Marvell, Arkansas, a small city in the United States
 Marvell Technology Group, American semiconductor company

People
 Andrew Marvell (1621–1678), English metaphysical poet and politician
 Marcus Marvell (born 1970), English cricketer
 Marjorie Marvell (born 1938), Australian cricket player
 William Marvell, 18th century English executioner
 Marvell Scott (born 1973), American sports reporter and physician
 Marvell Tell (born 1996), American football player
 Marvell Thomas (1941–2017), American keyboardist
 Marvell Wynne (baseball) (born 1959), American baseball player
 Marvell Wynne (soccer) (born 1986), American soccer player, son of the baseball player

See also
 Captain Marvel (Mar-Vell), a Marvel Comics character
 Marvel (disambiguation)
 Marville (disambiguation)